Same Bed, Different Dreams 2 - You Are My Destiny is a South Korean television entertainment program, distributed and syndicated by SBS. It's the second season of the show Same Bed, Different Dreams which underwent a format change, now focusing on the life of celebrity couples.

Main MC
Kim Gura
Seo Jang-hoon
Kim Sook

Special MC

Couples

Current couples
Lee Ji-hye & Moon Jae-wan (episode 192-present)
 & Hong Seong-ki (episode 211-present)
Im Chang-jung & Seo Ha-yan (episode 239-present) 
Oh Sang-jin &  (episode 265-present)
Lee Ahyumi & Kwon Ki-bum (episode 269-present) 
 &  (episode 280-present)

Former couples

Kim Hye-kyung & Lee Jae-myung (episode 1–11)
Kim Ji-na & Kim Soo-yong (episode 1–7)
Lee Ji-ae & Kim Jung-geun (episode 3–12)
Choo Ja-hyun & Yu Xiaoguang (episode 1–38)
Myung Seo-hyun & Jong Tae-se (episode 14–44)
Noh Sa-yeon & Lee Moo-seong (episode 39–48)
Shin Da-eun & Im Seong-bin (episode 46–53)
Choi Ji-yeon & Son Byong-ho (episode 54–61)
Ryu Seung-soo & Yoon Hye-won (episode 62–77)
Han Go-eun & Shin Young-soo (episode 56–80, episode 102-103)
Choi Min-soo & June Kang (episode (81-83, episode 88-92)
Jung Gyu Woon & Kim Woo Rim (episode 81-87)
 & Ahn Hyun-mo (episode 78-89, episode 93-99)
Shin Dong-mi & Heo Gyu (episode 91-101,104-107,110)
So Yi-hyun & In Gyo-jin (episode 31–115)
Yoon Sang-hyun & MayBee (episode 85-119)
Jo Hyun-jae & Park Min-jung (episode 104-122)
Ha Hee-ra & Choi Soo-jong (episode 30–36, episode 117-128)
Lee Yoon-ji & Jeong Han-Wool (episode 123-139)
Cho Choong-hyun & Kim Min-jung (episode 140-141)
Kangnam & Lee Sang-hwa (episode 114-143)
Jin Tae-hyun & Park Si-eun (episode 129-150,254-256,277)
Ha Jae-sook & Lee Joon-haeng (episode 142-149, episode 208-209)
Jang Shin-young & Kang Kyung-joon (episode 11–29, episode 48–55, episode 103, episode 160-167)
Park Sung-kwang & Lee Sol-yi (episode 144-198, episode 224, 228,266)
Chan Sung Jung & Park Seon-young (episode 148-175)
Song Chang-eui & Oh Ji-young (episode 155-193)
 & Cho Yu-ri (episode 156-164)
Jun Jin & Ryu Yi-seo (episode 165-207, episode 259)
Oh Ji-ho & Eun Bo-ah (episode 169-206)
Mihal Ashminov & Park Eun-hee (episode 186-193)
Jung Jo-gook & Kim Sung-eun (episode 194-210, episode 228)
Lee Ji-hoon (entertainer) & Ayane Miura (episode 204-222)
Kim Yoon-ji & Choi Woo-sung (episode 220-238, episode 258) 
 &  Jang Hee-jung (episode 230-241)
Son Dam-bi & Lee Kyou-hyuk (episode 245-256)
Andy Lee (South Korean singer) & Lee Eun-joo (episode 250-264)

Guests
Kim Saeng-min (episode 2)
Han Suk-joon (episode 10)
Kim Ho-Young (episode 30)

Ratings
In the table below,  represent the lowest ratings and  represent the highest ratings.

2017

2018

Awards and nominations

References

2017 South Korean television series debuts
Korean-language television shows
Seoul Broadcasting System original programming
South Korean variety television shows
Television series by SM C&C